Tor des Géants (meaning Tour of Giants in Valdôtain, the dialect of Arpitan spoken in Aosta Valley) is an endurance trail race which takes place in Aosta Valley, Italy, in September.

Description 
The start and the finish are in Courmayeur. The total length of the race is 330 km (205 mi) which must be completed in less than 150 hours. There are 43 refreshment points at which the runners can eat, sleep, and, if needed, obtain medical care. There are also 7 life bases, which are bigger than refreshment points. They are placed about every 50 km (31 mi). Because of its difficulty, many athletes do not complete the race. The completion rate is about 60%. Around 2000 volunteers are used to organize the race. Weather can be a challenge, given the large elevation changes over the course and competitors can encounter sun, rain, wind, and even snow. The number of participants is limited because of the complexity of managing people over the 330 km trek. For the 2015 edition were 2291 pre-registrations. The 2016 race was conducted under ITRA regulations.

The inaugural edition was in 2010.

The 2012 edition was interrupted on the fourth night and stopped on the fifth day at En Bosses (303 km).  About 70 runners completed the whole course.

The 2013 edition was marked by the death of the Chinese runner, Yang Yuan. He fell and hit his head on rocks during the rainy first night of the race. The site of the accident has a cairn inscribed with a poem written by Yang Yuan.

The 2015 edition was interrupted on the third night due to severe weather and stopped on the fourth night, because Col Malatra got covered by ice.  Only six runners completed the race.

In 2016, local authorities organized a competing race 4K VDA.  The suspected reasons were concerns for runner's safety and the costs.  The race started and ended in Cogne and went clockwise (unlike Tor).

The 2017 edition introduced a GPS tracking system. The Tor des Géants website, shows live data for each athlete including time of pass at specific points along the path, overall ranking, median speed, distance and elevation gain traveled.  There is also a map that shows the athletes live position.

Path 

During the tour, the runners cross 34 municipalities, 25 mountain passes over 2000 metres, 30 alpine lakes and 2 natural parks. The minimum altitude is 300 m (985 ft) and the highest is 3,300 m (10800 ft). The total elevation gain is about 24,000 m (78700 ft).

Hall of Fame

Photos

References 

Ultramarathons
Trail running competitions